El Relleno, also known as the Alameda landfill area, was a sports venue in the city of Vigo, Spain. El Relleno played a pivotal role in the early steps of football in Vigo, being the home of football in Vigo. It served as the home ground of the very first football clubs in the city, it served as the pitch for the very first football games played in Vigo, and thus, the place of numerous historical landmarks such as the first recognized game played in Vigo on 9 February 1905 between Exiles FC and Exmouth and the first household of Vigo FC.

Origins
Throughout the 19th century, Vigo suffered a couple of natural land reclamations, including a large piece of land that had been stolen from that sea, in which a mall with gardens would later be built, a mall who even today bears the name of Emilio García Olloqui, the promoter of this work with which he enlarged the city towards the sea. This landfill soon become known as El Relleno due to its proximity to the Relleno Squares. In the 1870s, an International Communications Telegraph Center was established (located on Taboada Leal street), known in Vigo as "El Cable Inglés". The English Cable workers soon established a sports club in 1873, the Exiles Cable Club, which formed a football section in 1876 known as Exiles Football Club, and they controlled all the ships that anchored in the port of Vigo to challenge its crews (if English) to a football match at the Alameda landfill area (which was located nearby the port), thus playing football games against members of the crews of English ships, ranging from sailors to captains through officers. The games were held in El Relleno, thus being one of the first football fields in the country.

El Relleno dominance
El Relleno became the home of football in Vigo and began to bring together hundreds of people, especially on Sundays. Also, little by little, some Spaniards who were studying in England or France began to be incorporated into these British-origin teams from Vigo.

On 9 February 1905, El Relleno had the honour of hosting the very first (recorded) football match in Vigo, in which the Exiles FC played against a team made up of sailors from the British battleship, HMS Exmouth, anchored in the port, in front of a large crowd at the Alameda landfill area, known as El Relleno. The Vigo fans were devoted to the players of Cable Inglés, which was ultimately believed to be the team that represented the city. Thus, the first players who defended the football pavilion of Vigo were English, and they rose to victory with a 3–0 win. On the following day, 10 February, a group of students from Vigo did not hesitate to confront the sailors of the British battleship HMS Triumph, also at the Relleno, given their inexperience they lost 3–0, however, the most important thing was not the result, but its historical significance, as it was one of the first times that the youth of Vigo began to be interested in that new sport. Moreover, the many spectators who had attended El Relleno to witness the match were pleasantly impressed by its spectacular nature, thus arousing a great expectation among the football enthusiasts of Vigo, who soon created a club of their own, Vigo Football Club.

Three months later, on 14 May 1905, the newly-created Vigo FC played against the Exiles, and despite being hotly contested they lost 0–1 to the British, with a goal that was achieved almost at the end of the game. El Relleno was starting to become too small for the crowd who was growing every day, and in fact, the limits of the field of play were highlighted before the game, but due to a lack of options, the game was held there. Finally, with a large audience at the Relleno, the Vigo FC players took to the field wearing a red and white checkered shirt and white shorts, which were the colours of the city. Vigo FC's first-ever line-up included the likes of the Ocaña brothers (Andrés and Manuel) and César Rodríguez. The players from Vigo were constantly applauded by the fans at the El Relleno who witnessed and enjoyed this new sporting spectacle that was entering their lives.

Besides Vigo FC, the Petit Football Club was also established in May of 1905, and just like their fellow neighbours, the club's home ground was the Relleno field, and it was Petit who defeated the "invincible" team of Cable Inglés. The delirium of the fans who had come to El Relleno to witness this match was enormous when they saw how Petit FC achieved an unexpected victory against the English in a sensational match, defeating them 2–0. Some of the players who lined up for Petit that day were goalkeeper Raúl López, César Rodríguez, Francisco Estévez, Roberto Pérez and Rafael Tapias, with the latter two being the goal scorers, which were loudly and widely applauded by the entire Vigo public, who could not believe their team's victory. There is no doubt that this triumph of Petit FC against Cable Inglés was a pivotal event in football in Vigo.

Decline and collapse
Exiles continued to play in the El Relleno until the end of 1910, the year in which the venue was demolished. The year of the enclosure is unknown.

El Relleno, nowadays urbanised into six residential blocks of houses and divided by the current Luis Taboada street.

References

Defunct football venues in Spain
RC Celta de Vigo
Sports venues completed in 1876
Sports venues demolished in 1910